Niele Deirdre Jamillah Viveca Ivey (born September 24, 1977) is an American college basketball coach and the current head coach for the Notre Dame Fighting Irish women's basketball team. She is a former Women's National Basketball Association (WNBA) player for the Indiana Fever, Detroit Shock, and Phoenix Mercury. Prior to her move to the NBA in August 2019, she was an assistant coach for the University of Notre Dame women's basketball team, where she had played in college. She was an All-American point guard and became the 17th player in school history to record over 1,000 career points. She received the Frances Pomeroy Naismith Award presented for the nation's top player under 5'8" in 2001. She would go on to lead the Irish women to their first NCAA Championship in 2001, in her hometown of St. Louis as a fifth-year senior.

In the WNBA, she finished her career with 408 points, including over 100 in 2 separate seasons. She also had ninety 3-point field goals, 228 assists, and 94 steals.

High school
Ivey grew up playing many sports, but especially basketball. She learned the game from her older brothers, and was shooting from three-point range by the time she was in fourth grade. She attracted attention for her long-range shooting from high school coaches, including Gary Glasscock of Cor Jesu Academy in St. Louis. Ivey had attended Catholic grade school, so it was a natural fit to attend Cor Jesu. As a junior, Ivey scored 18 points per game to help her team to a 31–0 record and a Class 4A State Championship, the first in school history.

College career
Ivey was a big fan of Michael Jordan, who attended college at the University of North Carolina, so she was determined to go there for college. She used her own money to attend a basketball camp in Chapel Hill, but the UNC head coach, Sylvia Hatchell, appeared only at the opening and closing of the camp, and did not get a chance to see Ivey play. Muffet McGraw of Notre Dame became interested in Ivey, and traveled to St. Louis a number of times to watch Ivey play pick-up games at the YMCA in St. Louis. McGraw was prohibited by NCAA rules from talking to recruits at this time, but Ivey was aware of her presence, and it convinced her that McGraw was seriously interested in her. Ivey decided to commit to attend Notre Dame.

Notre Dame statistics
Source

Coaching career
Following the retirement of Notre Dame women's coach Muffet McGraw in April 2020, Ivey was named the Fighting Irish head coach.

Personal life

Ivey was born September 24, 1977, in Saint Louis, Missouri, to Thomas and Theresa Ivey. She was the youngest of five children, and the only daughter. She attended Cor Jesu Academy in St. Louis and played at the University of Notre Dame. She has one child, Jaden Ivey, born on Feb. 13 2002, with former Notre Dame and NFL player Javin Hunter. Jaden played college basketball for Purdue and in 2022 was drafted with the fifth pick of the First Round by the Detroit Pistons.

Head coaching record

References

Sources

External links
 http://www.wnba.com/playerfile/niele_ivey/index.html

1977 births
Living people
All-American college women's basketball players
American women's basketball players
Basketball coaches from Missouri
Basketball players from St. Louis
Detroit Shock players
Indiana Fever draft picks
Indiana Fever players
Memphis Grizzlies assistant coaches
Notre Dame Fighting Irish women's basketball coaches
Notre Dame Fighting Irish women's basketball players
Phoenix Mercury players
Xavier Musketeers women's basketball coaches